DXNU-TV Ch. 51 is a UHF television station owned by Information Broadcast Unlimited (IBU) and operated by Breakthrough and Milestones Productions International (BMPI), the network's content provider and marketing arm and Christian religious organization Members Church of God International (MCGI). The station's Studio and transmitter are located at the Progressive Southern Mindanao Complex, Shrine Hills, Matina, Davao City, Davao del Sur Province, Mindanao, Philippines, Its operated daily from 12:00 midnight to 8:00 P.M. for the Mindanao regions only.

Members Church of God International
Television stations in Davao City
Television channels and stations established in 2001